Tiger Field is a former Minor League Baseball venue in the Western United States, located in Redding, California. Opened in 1923, it is the home of the summer collegiate Redding Colt 45s. The ballpark is named for its first tenant, the semi-pro Redding Tigers. Tiger Field is on the corner of Market Street and Cypress Ave.

The stadium has gone through many renovations over the years. In the 1940s and 1950s, the stadium had a large wooden grandstand. Soon after the folding of the Redding Browns and a fire in the grandstands in 1955, the grandstands were torn down and the stadium orientation was flipped so that the current location of home plate is in the original location of right field.

In 2016 the stadium received a major upgrade and face lift. The field was re-sodded, the backstop was moved up, new backstop nets were installed, new stadium seats from the former Travis Credit Union Park in Vacaville, California, were installed, and the dugouts were renovated and expanded.

See also
 Nettleton Stadium
 Arcata Ball Park
 Harry & David Field
 Kiger Stadium
 Miles Field demolished in 2005
 Appeal-Democrat Park
 Travis Credit Union Park demolished 2008

References

External links
 Tiger Field official site
 Tiger Field History
 City of Redding Park Website

Baseball venues in California
1923 establishments in California
Sports venues completed in 1923
Buildings and structures in Redding, California
Minor league baseball venues